Malachiini is a large tribe of soft-winged flower beetles in the family Melyridae.

Selected genera

 Ablechroides Wittmer, 1976
 Ablechrus Waterhouse, 1877
 Anthocomus Erichson, 1840
 Antholinus Mulsant & Rey, 1867
 Attalogonia Wittmer, 1976
 Attalus Erichson, 1840
 Attalusinus Leng, 1918
 Axinotarsus Motschulsky, 1854
 Cerapheles Mulsant, 1867
 Ceratistes Fischer von Waldheim, 1844
 Charopus Erichson, 1840
 Collops Erichson, 1840
 Condylattalus Wittmer, 1976
 Condylops Redtenbacher, 1849
 Dicranolaius Champion, 1921
 Ebaeus Erichson, 1840
 Endeodes LeConte, 1859
 Fortunatius Evers, 1971
 Hypebaeus Kiesenwetter, 1863
 Ifnidius Escalera, 1940
 Laius Guérin-Méneville, 1830
 Macrotrichopherus Evers, 1962
 Malachiomimus Champion, 1921
 Malachius Fabricius, 1775
 Microlipus Leconte, 1852
 Nepachys Thomson, 1859
 Nodopus Marshall, 1951
 Opsablechrus Wittmer, 1976
 Sphinginus Mulsant & Rey, 1867
 Sternodeattalus Wittmer, 1970
 Tanaops Leconte, 1859
 Temnopsophus Horn, 1872
 Troglops Erichson, 1840
 Trophimus Horn, 1870
 Tucumanius Pic, 1903

References

Further reading

External links

 

Melyridae